Curtis Ofori (born November 20, 2005) is an American professional soccer player who plays as a left-back for Major League Soccer club New York Red Bulls.

Club career
Born in Hopewell Junction, New York, Ofori first began playing soccer at the age of three in nearby Wappingers Falls. He would later join the Wappingers Lightning, a club team coached by his father. In 2017, Ofori was recruited into the youth setup of the New York Red Bulls, joining the club's under-13 side. He progressed through the ranks of the academy and began playing for the under-19's in 2020, scoring his first goal for the side against Cedar Stars Monmouth. With the Red Bulls academy, Ofori scored a total of 5 goals in 67 matches.

New York Red Bulls II
On March 22, 2021, Ofori signed a professional contract with New York Red Bulls II, the reserve affiliate of the New York Red Bulls in the USL Championship. He was the youngest professional signing in Red Bulls II history, joining the club at the age of 15 years and 122 days old. Prior to signing, Red Bulls II head coach John Wolyniec stated that Ofori had trained with Red Bulls II the previous season.

Ofori made his senior debut for New York Red Bulls II on May 7, 2021, against the Charleston Battery, coming on as a late-substitute in the 1–1 draw.

New York Red Bulls
On December 1, 2022, it was announced that Ofori had signed a homegrown contract with the New York Red Bulls, starting from the 2023 season.

International career
While with the Red Bulls youth academy, Ofori was selected to be part of the roster for the United States under-14 boys national talent identification east team in April 2019.

Career statistics

References

External links
 Profile at U.S. Soccer Development Academy

2005 births
Living people
People from Hopewell Junction, New York
American soccer players
Association football defenders
New York Red Bulls II players
New York Red Bulls players
USL Championship players
Soccer players from New York (state)
Homegrown Players (MLS)
American sportspeople of Ghanaian descent